A witch trial is a legal proceeding that is part of a witch-hunt.

Witch trial may also refer to:
 Salem witch trials, a series of hearings and prosecutions of people accused of witchcraft in colonial Massachusetts between February 1692 and May 1693
 "Witch Trial" (Charmed), an episode from Charmed season two
 The Witch Trials, an electropunk musical group (1980–1981)

See also
Witch hunt (disambiguation)
Witch hunter (disambiguation)
Witchfinder General (disambiguation)
:Category:Witch trials